was the pen-name of , a Japanese author noted for his poetry in pre-World War II Japan.

Life
Wakayama was born in Togo, Miyazaki, (now part of the city of Hyūga) as the eldest son of a doctor. He became interested in poetry from middle school, taking the name of "Bokusui" from the age of 18. He entered Waseda University in 1904, where one of his classmates was Hakushu Kitahara. After graduation, he was hired by the Chuo Shimbun newspaper in 1909, but quit after only five months. 

He decided to devote himself to poetry, and became a disciple of Saishū Onoe. He traveled all over Japan and Korea, composing many tanka about the places he visited. He settled in Numazu, Shizuoka in 1920. He also loved sake, and heavy drinking eventually resulted in cirrhosis of the liver. He died in 1928.

Before he died he wrote a death haiku that reads:

Works

Poetry books
 (published July 1908)
 (published January 1910)
 (published April 1910)
 (published September 1911)
 (published September 1912)
 (published September 1913)
 (published April 1914)
 (published October 1915)
 (published June 1916)
 (published August 1917)
 (published July 1918)
 (published May 1918) 
 (published March 1921)
 (published May 1923)
 (published September 1938)

External links

Official website 
E-texts of Wakayama's works at Aozora Bunko 
numazu city Wakayama Bokusui memorial hall
numazu city website
Hyuga city website
Places associated with Bokusui Wakayama
of Haiku by Bokusui Wakayama
of Haiku by Bokusui Wakayama in Chiba prefecture

1885 births
1928 deaths
20th-century Japanese poets
People from Miyazaki Prefecture
Waseda University alumni